Wedderburn is an unincorporated coastal community in Curry County, Oregon, United States. It is to the north of, and across the mouth of the Rogue River from Gold Beach, on U.S. Route 101. The Isaac Lee Patterson Bridge connects Wedderburn with Gold Beach.

Wedderburn was founded by R. D. Hume, a prominent local businessman in the fishing industry, who named the community after the home of his ancestors, Wedderburn Castle in Scotland. Wedderburn post office was established in 1895.

Wedderburn was originally a company town for Hume's salmon fishing monopoly, and besides his fishing fleet, he ran Wedderburn's cannery, store, race track and cold storage plant. Hume had settled at the mouth of the Rogue in 1876, and he eventually owned all the land on both banks of the river from the Pacific Ocean to the head of the tidewater.

Demographics

Climate
This region experiences warm (but not hot) and dry summers, with no average monthly temperatures above .  According to the Köppen Climate Classification system, Wedderburn has a warm-summer Mediterranean climate, abbreviated "Csb" on climate maps.

Education
It is in the Central Curry School District, which operates two schools: Riley Creek Elementary School (K-8) and Gold Beach High School.

The entire county is in the Southwestern Oregon Community College district.

References

Further reading
Dodds, Gordon B. The Salmon King of Oregon: R. D. Hume and the Pacific Fisheries 
Douthit, Nathan. A Guide to Oregon South Coast History: Traveling the Jedediah Smith Trail 
LaPlante, Margaret. The Town That Floated into Place: Wedderburn, Oregon

External links
Article on R. D. Hume from The Oregon Encyclopedia

Company towns in Oregon
Oregon Coast
Unincorporated communities in Curry County, Oregon
1895 establishments in Oregon
Populated places established in 1895
Unincorporated communities in Oregon
Populated coastal places in Oregon